The NZR D class of 1929 comprised one 0-4-0 tank locomotive that was built for the New Zealand Railways Department by the Clayton Wagons Ltd in Lincoln, England.

History 
Originally, D 1 was purchased for railcar type service but it was not successful. At a normal engine speed of 400 rpm, the unit was calculated to develop . The engine drove a central transverse jackshaft through reduction gearing, the drive from the jackshaft being transmitted to the wheels through conventional side rods.

Working Life 
However it never proved satisfactory and was written off in 1936 and scrapped and  D 1 did not survive to be preserved.

Notes and references

Notes

References 

 
 
 

D
Scrapped locomotives
Railway locomotives introduced in 1929
3 ft 6 in gauge locomotives of New Zealand